12th Politburo may refer to:
 12th Politburo of the Chinese Communist Party
 Politburo of the 12th Congress of the Russian Communist Party (Bolsheviks)
 12th Politburo of the Communist Party of Czechoslovakia
 12th Politburo of the Romanian Communist Party
 12th Politburo of the Communist Party of Czechoslovakia
 12th Politburo of the Communist Party of Vietnam
 12th Politburo of the League of Communists of Yugoslavia
 12th Politburo of the Hungarian Socialist Workers' Party